The 10th Glover Trophy was a motor race, run for Formula One cars, held on 23 April 1962 at Goodwood Circuit, England. The race was run over 42 laps of the circuit, and was won by British driver Graham Hill in a BRM P57.

This race was held directly after the 1962 Lavant Cup, on the same day at the same circuit. Bruce McLaren, who had won the Lavant Cup, finished second in this race. Another Formula One race, the 1962 Pau Grand Prix, was also held on the same day.

This event was particularly notable for the serious accident suffered by Stirling Moss, which ended his Formula One career.

Results

References
 "The Grand Prix Who's Who", Steve Small, 1995.
 "The Formula One Record Book", John Thompson, 1974.

Glover Trophy
Glover Trophy
20th century in West Sussex
GloverTrophy
Glover Trophy